Senator Street may refer to:

Milton Street (born 1941), Pennsylvania State Senate
Sharif Street (born 1974), Pennsylvania State Senate
William C. Street (1816–1893), Connecticut State Senate